Praia Baixo is a village in the southeastern part of the island of Santiago, Cape Verde. It is part of the municipality of São Domingos and the parish of Nossa Senhora da Luz. It is situated on the east coast, 1.5 km northwest of Achada Baleia, 11 km southeast of Pedra Badejo, 10 km east of São Domingos and 16 km north of the capital Praia. In 2010 its population was 952. 

The beach of Praia Baixo is a nesting area for loggerhead sea turtles. A protection program is organized by the University of Algarve, Faro, Portugal

References

Villages and settlements in Santiago, Cape Verde
Populated coastal places in Cape Verde
São Domingos Municipality, Cape Verde
Baixo